Almadina means "the city" in Arabic and may refer to:
 Almadina, Bahia, a municipality in Bahia, Brazil
 Medina, a city in Saudi Arabia mentioned in the quran as the place where the Islamic prophet Muhammed lived after fleeing from Mecca
 Al Madina (newspaper), in Saudi Arabia
 Al-Madina (Israeli newspaper), Israeli-Arabic newspaper
 Almadina (school), a charter school in Calgary, Alberta, Canada
 Almadina Sports Club, a Libyan football club
 Almahalla Tripoli, a Libyan football club